SM UB-97 was a German Type UB III submarine or U-boat in the German Imperial Navy during World War I. She was commissioned into the German Imperial Navy on 25 July 1918  as SM UB-97.

UB-97 was surrendered to the Allies at Harwich on 21 November 1918 in accordance with the requirements of the Armistice with Germany. After passing into British hands, UB-97 was towed to Falmouth along with five other U-boats  for use in a series of explosive test trials by the Royal Navy in Falmouth Bay, in order to find weaknesses in their design. Following her use on 7 March 1921, UB-97 was dumped on Castle Beach and sold to R. Roskelly & Rodgers on 19 April 1921 for scrap (for £50), and partially salvaged over the following decades, although parts remain in situ.

Construction

he was built by AG Vulcan of Hamburg and following just under a year of construction, launched at Hamburg on 13 June 1918. UB-97 was commissioned later the same year under the command of Oblt.z.S. Oskar Brinkmann. Like all Type UB III submarines, UB-97 carried 10 torpedoes and was armed with a  deck gun. UB-97 had a displacement of  while surfaced and  when submerged. Her engines enabled her to travel at  when surfaced and  when submerged.

References

Notes

Citations

Bibliography 

 

German Type UB III submarines
World War I submarines of Germany
U-boats commissioned in 1918
1918 ships
Ships built in Hamburg